Anora Davlyatova (born 17 February 1999) is an Uzbekistani individual rhythmic gymnast.

Career 
Davlyatova competed at the 2014 Summer Youth Olympics in Nanjing, China where she qualified in the Finals finishing in 8th place.

Davlyatova has competed at the world championships, including at the 2015 World Rhythmic Gymnastics Championships. On June 24–27, Davlyatova competed at the 2017 Asian Championships where she was member of the Uzbek Team that won the gold medal.

References

External links
 
 https://database.fig-gymnastics.com/public/gymnasts/biography/20722/true?backUrl=%2Fpublic%2Fresults%2Fdisplay%2F5763%3FidAgeCategory%3D7%26idCategory%3D71%23anchor_36531
 http://www.gymmedia.com/Rhythmic-Gymnastics/13th-Junior-Rhythmic-Gymnastics-Asian-Championships
 http://195.158.28.46/uz/site/page.html?id=19231
 http://news.uzreport.uz/news_10_u_123485.html

1999 births
Living people
Uzbekistani rhythmic gymnasts
Place of birth missing (living people)
Gymnasts at the 2014 Summer Youth Olympics